Joe Average  (born October 10, 1957, as Brock David Tebbutt) is a Canadian artist who resides in Vancouver, British Columbia.  Diagnosed HIV+ at age 27, Average made the decision to commit the rest of his life to art, and to challenge himself to live by his art. He was born in Victoria, British Columbia, Canada.

Average frequently donates work to charitable causes, such as Vancouver's annual Art for Life auction.  His work has been used for such projects as A Loving Spoonful (a charity which provides meals to people with terminal illnesses) and the Davie Village. Average has also been selected to judge submissions for Vancouver's AIDS memorial and anti-homophobia posters.

Average is known for his cheerful, colourful, cartoon-like work, including images of flowers, animals and insects, and people. He has received many awards and honors, including civic merit awards, the Caring Canadian Award (1998) and the Queen's Golden Jubilee Silver Medal for Outstanding Community Achievement (2002). Vancouver mayor Philip Owen issued a civic proclamation to designate November 3, 2002 as "Joe Average Day" in the city.

Average was honored as one of two grand marshals of Vancouver's annual gay pride parade in August 2006.
In 2011, he had lipodystrophy, a not-uncommon side effect of antiretroviral therapy.

On April 23, 2019, the Royal Canadian Mint released a coin with art by Average, said to symbolize the progress lesbian, gay, transgender, queer and two-spirited people have achieved in Canada as well as the work that still needs to be done.

Honours
 Royal Canadian Academy of Arts
 Order of British Columbia (2021)

References

External links
Joe Average

1957 births
Canadian gay artists
Gay painters
Living people
Canadian LGBT painters
Members of the Royal Canadian Academy of Arts
Members of the Order of British Columbia
Artists from Vancouver
Artists from Victoria, British Columbia
People with HIV/AIDS
Canadian male painters
Canadian currency designers
20th-century Canadian painters
21st-century Canadian painters
20th-century Canadian male artists
21st-century Canadian male artists
21st-century Canadian LGBT people
20th-century Canadian LGBT people